The Goonies is a 1986 platform game by Konami for the MSX based on the film of the same name. The music is a simple rendition of the song "The Goonies 'R' Good Enough", by Cyndi Lauper.

Gameplay
The Goonies is a platform and puzzle game, featuring five 'scenes'. After each successfully completed scene, a key word is given and thus the player can continue the game from this point at any time.

References

External links

1986 video games
Konami games
The Goonies video games
MSX games
MSX-only games
Video games developed in Japan

ja:グーニーズ (ゲーム)